Anthony "Tony" Dobbins (born August 23, 1981) is an American-Italian professional basketball player and coach who last played for Scafati Basket of the Italian Serie A2 Basket.

Professional career

Playing in Europe 
On August 6, 2013, he signed with JDA Dijon for the 2013–14 season. At the end of the season, he was again named the French League Best Defensive player of the Year.

On July 17, 2014, Dobbins signed with French club Strasbourg IG for the 2014–15 season.

On November 13, 2015, he signed with Viola Reggio Calabria for the 2015–16 Serie A2 Basket season.

On September 8, 2016, he signed with French club BCM Gravelines. On November 6, 2016, he parted ways with Gravelines after appearing in seven league games and three FIBA Europe Cup games. On December 17, 2016, he returned to Italian Serie A2 and signed with Scafati Basket.

Coaching career

Boston Celtics 
In 2020, he was promoted as an assistant coach by the Boston Celtics after spending two year as video team with the Celtics.

References

External links
 Euroleague Profile
 Eurobasket.com Profile
 Draftexpress.com Profile
 French League Profile
 Italian League Profile 

1981 births
Living people
African-American basketball players
American expatriate basketball people in France
American expatriate basketball people in Greece
American expatriate basketball people in Italy
American expatriate basketball people in Spain
American men's basketball players
Asheville Altitude players
Basketball players from Washington, D.C.
BCM Gravelines players
CB Murcia players
Cholet Basket players
HTV Basket players
Italian men's basketball players
JDA Dijon Basket players
Makedonikos B.C. players
Orléans Loiret Basket players
Poitiers Basket 86 players
Richmond Spiders men's basketball players
Shooting guards
SIG Basket players
Virginia Tech Hokies men's basketball players
21st-century African-American sportspeople
20th-century African-American people